Neofriseria peliella is a moth of the family Gelechiidae. It is found in most of Europe (except Ireland and most of the Balkan Peninsula) east to the Ural Mountains. Outside of Europe, it is found in Turkey and North Africa. 

The wingspan is 13–17 mm. Adults are on wing from June to September.

The larvae feed on Rumex acetosella. They initially mine the leaves of their host plant. Young larvae make an irregular blotch in the young leaves. Older larvae live freely in a spinning at the base of the stem and the root crown. Larvae can be found from August to May of the following year. They are chocolate brown with a black head. The species overwinters in the larval stage.

References

Moths described in 1835
Neofriseria
Moths of Europe